Bernd Lucke (born 19 August 1962) is a German economist and politician. Lucke was elected a Member of the European Parliament (MEP) for the Alternative für Deutschland (AfD) in 2014. He failed to win reelection in 2019.

He is a professor of economics at the University of Hamburg, a co-founder of Wahlalternative 2013 ("Electoral Alternative 2013"), and a founder of the party Alternative for Germany (AfD). Lucke lost the leadership of the AfD to Frauke Petry in July 2015. Petry's election was considered a shift of the party to extremist positions; Lucke subsequently left the party. In July 2015 he and other former AfD members founded the political party Liberal-Konservative Reformer (formerly Allianz für Fortschritt und Aufbruch, "Alliance for progress and renewal", abbreviated ALFA).

Biography 
From 1982 to 1984, Lucke studied economics, history, and philosophy at the University of Bonn; he undertook graduate studies in economics at the University of Bonn and UC Berkeley from 1984 to 1987. He completed his doctorate in 1991 with a dissertation on price stabilization in world agricultural markets under Jürgen Wolters at Free University of Berlin. After the fall of the Berlin Wall, he worked in the Council of Economic Experts of the East German Government and, after the German reunification, as an assistant to the Senate of Berlin. Lucke's research interests include sovereign default, news-driven business cycles, growth in developing countries, dynamic CGE models, and applied econometrics.

Lucke has been an advisor to the World Bank and a visiting scholar at the University of British Columbia in Vancouver. He is a frequent guest on political talk shows in Germany. He is married and has five children.

During a campaign speech in Bremen on 24 August 2013, Lucke was attacked with pepper spray by two members of Anti-fascist Action. Several people in the audience were treated for irritation of the eyes and throat.

On 4 July 2015, Lucke was displaced as leader of the party Alternative for Germany (AfD) by his former deputy, Frauke Petry, after several months of infighting. On 9 July 2015, Lucke left the Alternative for Germany, saying that the party had "fallen irretrievably into the wrong hands" after Petry's election, and on 19 July, he and other former members of the AfD founded a new party, the Alliance for Progress and Renewal (ALFA). ALFA has since been renamed Liberal-Konservative Reformer ("Liberal-conservative reformers").

Selected publications

References

External links 

 University of Hamburg, Bernd Lucke (de)
 Homepage of "Plenum of Economists"
 Homepage of "Bündnis Bürgerwille" (Alliance of Citizens' Will")
 Cofounder of "Wahlalternative 2013" (Election Alternative 2013)
 Party Hompeage Lucke speaker of "Alternative für Deutschland" (Alternative for Germany)
 Marsh, David, "New anti-euro party intensifies pressure on Merkel", MarketWatch, 15 April 2013.
 Spiegel portrait of Bernd Lucke and AfD, May 2014
 Business Insider: Meet the Influential German Professor Who Wants to Get Rid of the Euro in Order to Save Europe retrieved 30 March 2013.
 Deutsche Welle interview with Bernd Lucke: Where is the German Euroskeptic party AfD headed? retrieved July 2015.

Living people
1962 births
Liberal Conservative Reformers MEPs
Alternative for Germany MEPs
Writers from Berlin
German economists
Academic staff of the University of Hamburg
Academic staff of the Free University of Berlin
Academic staff of the Humboldt University of Berlin
Academic staff of the University of British Columbia
German philosophers
Christian Democratic Union of Germany politicians
Liberal Conservative Reformers politicians
Leaders of political parties in Germany
MEPs for Germany 2014–2019
German male non-fiction writers
Political party founders